The Women's 30 kilometre freestyle event of the FIS Nordic World Ski Championships 2017 was held on 4 March 2017.

Results
The race was started at 14:30.

References

Women's 30 kilometre freestyle
2017 in Finnish women's sport